Kenneth Owen Burton (born 11 February 1950) is an English former footballer who played in the Football League for Chesterfield, Halifax Town, Peterborough United and Sheffield Wednesday.

References

External links
 

English footballers
English Football League players
1950 births
Living people
Sheffield Wednesday F.C. players
Peterborough United F.C. players
Chesterfield F.C. players
Halifax Town A.F.C. players
Worksop Town F.C. players
Association football defenders